Salcher is a German surname. Notable people with the surname include:

Andreas Salcher (born 1960), Austrian politician, consultant, and author
Markus Salcher (born 1991), Austrian alpine skier
Peter Salcher (1848–1928), Austrian and Croatian physicist

See also
Sacher

German-language surnames